Petit Jean Park Airport  is a public use airport located eight nautical miles (9 mi, 15 km) west of the central business district of Morrilton, in Conway County, Arkansas, United States. It is owned by the State of Arkansas.

This airport is included in the FAA's National Plan of Integrated Airport Systems for 2011–2015, which categorized it as a general aviation facility.

Facilities and aircraft 
Petit Jean Park Airport covers an area of 148 acres (60 ha) at an elevation of 923 feet (281 m) above mean sea level. It has one runway designated 3/21 with an asphalt surface measuring 5,853 by 75 feet (1,784 x 23 m). For the 12-month period ending May 31, 2009, the airport had 1,000 aircraft operations, an average of 83 per month: 95% general aviation and 5% military.

References

External links 
 Aerial image as of 28 February 2001 from USGS The National Map
 

Airports in Arkansas
Transportation in Conway County, Arkansas